Shadower may refer to:

Fleet shadower (disambiguation), aircraft designed to tail enemy vessels
Airspeed Fleet Shadower
General Aircraft Fleet Shadower
The Shadower 3D, a 2012 experimental art film; see List of 3D films (2005 onwards)
The Shadowers, a 1964 novel by Donald Hamilton

See also
Shadowing (disambiguation)